Scotorythra trapezias is a moth of the family Geometridae. It was first described by Edward Meyrick in 1899.

It is endemic to the Hawaiian islands of Kauai, Oahu, Molokai, Maui and Hawaii.

The larvae feed on Dodonaea species.

External links

trapez
Endemic moths of Hawaii
Biota of Hawaii (island)
Biota of Kauai
Biota of Maui
Biota of Oahu